Ajayi Agbebaku (born 6 December 1955) is a retired Nigerian Olympian  who competed in the triple jump.  He still holds the indoor record at the University of Missouri with his jump of 16.60 metres at the 1978 NCAA indoor championships. 

Agbebaku was born in Lagos. His personal best jump was 17.26 metres, achieved in July 1983 in Edmonton. This is the Nigerian record as well as second in Africa, only behind Ndabazinhle Mdhlongwa. He holds the African indoor record with 17.00 metres, achieved in January 1982 in Dallas.

Achievements

1983 World Championships in Athletics – bronze medal

References

External links

1955 births
Living people
Nigerian male triple jumpers
Athletes (track and field) at the 1984 Summer Olympics
Yoruba sportspeople
Olympic athletes of Nigeria
World Athletics Championships medalists
World Athletics Championships athletes for Nigeria
Universiade medalists in athletics (track and field)
Universiade gold medalists for Nigeria
Medalists at the 1983 Summer Universiade
20th-century Nigerian people